The North Carolina Education Lottery 200 at The Rock Presented by Cheerwine was a NASCAR Camping World Truck Series race held at the Rockingham Speedway in Rockingham, North Carolina. The race consisted of 200 laps, 203.4 miles (320 km). The inaugural race was run on April 15, 2012, and was won by Kasey Kahne.

History

On September 2, 2011, NASCAR announced that Rockingham Speedway would hold a Camping World Truck Series event for the 2012 season. During the inaugural race, Nelson Piquet Jr. started on the pole position and Kasey Kahne won the race.

In 2013, the race went for 205 laps instead of 200 laps because of green-white-checkered rules. The rookie Kyle Larson won his first truck series win in his first year but the race became notable because of controversy. Truck series veteran Ron Hornaday Jr. got contact with Kyle Busch Motorsports driver; the rookie Darrell Wallace Jr. In a similar fashion to an incident with Kyle Busch at Texas two years prior in the WinStar World Casino 350K. Hornaday tapped Wallace sending him into the fences. Ron Hornaday took responsibility and apologized but claimed that he did not intend to wreck Wallace; NASCAR, the media and fans felt differently when they saw a video that showed Hornaday frowning towards Wallace's truck before the tap. NASCAR black-flagged Hornaday and sent him to the back of the field on the restart, later fined him $25,000 and put him on probation until June 12. The penalties were also controversial because the fans, drivers, and medias wanted Hornaday's penalties harsher since Kyle Busch was parked after the Texas incident.

In 2014, the Truck Series did not return to the track due to financial struggles.

Past winners

2013: Race extended due to a green–white–checker finish.

Multiple winners (teams)

Manufacturer wins

References

External links
 

2012 establishments in North Carolina
2013 disestablishments in North Carolina
 
Former NASCAR races
NASCAR Truck Series races
Recurring sporting events established in 2012
Recurring sporting events disestablished in 2013